William James Calder was a New Zealand rugby league footballer who represented New Zealand. His grandson, Quentin Pongia, also played for New Zealand.

Playing career
Calder first played in the West Coast Rugby League competition and represented the West Coast and the South Island. He made his debut for New Zealand in 1930 and played in his first test match in 1932. Calder went on to play in eight test matches for New Zealand.

References

New Zealand rugby league players
New Zealand national rugby league team players
West Coast rugby league team players
South Island rugby league team players
Rugby league props